The 2020–21 Michigan Wolverines women's basketball team represented the University of Michigan during the 2020–21 NCAA Division I women's basketball season. The Wolverines, led by head coach Kim Barnes Arico in her ninth year, played their home games at the Crisler Center. This season marked the program's 39th season as a member of the Big Ten Conference.

This season was highlighted by the Wolverines starting the season 10–0, their best start to a season in program history. They also reached No. 11 in the AP Poll, their highest rank ever, and were ranked the No. 6 seed in the 2021 NCAA tournament, their highest seed ever. The Wolverines also advanced to the Sweet Sixteen for the first time in program history.

Previous season
The Wolverines finished the 2019–20 season with a 21–11 record, including 10–8 in Big Ten play to finish in seventh place. They advanced to the semifinals of the Big Ten women's tournament, where they lost to Ohio State. The 2020 NCAA Division I women's basketball tournament was cancelled due to the COVID-19 pandemic.

Roster

Schedule and results

|-
! colspan="9" style="background:#242961; color:#F7BE05;"| Non-conference regular season

|-
! colspan="9" style="background:#242961; color:#F7BE05;"| Big Ten conference season

|-
! colspan="9" style="background:#242961; color:#F7BE05;"| Big Ten Women's Tournament

|-
! colspan="9" style="background:#242961; color:#F7BE05;"| NCAA Women's Tournament

Rankings

^Coaches did not release a Week 2 poll.

Awards and honors
On March 8, 2021, the Big Ten announced its conference awards. Naz Hillmon was named Big Ten Conference Player of the Year and a unanimous All-Big Ten first team selection by both the coaches and media.  Leigha Brown earned All-Big Ten second team honors by both the coaches and the media, and Akienreh Johnson was named to the All-Defensive team. Hillmon was also named a first-team All-American by Sports Illustrated, and second-team by Associated Press. Hillmon became the first Wolverine to be selected for All-America honors in program history.

References

Michigan
Michigan
Michigan
Michigan
Michigan Wolverines women's basketball seasons